Triphenylmethanol (also known as triphenylcarbinol and TrOH) is an organic compound.  It is a white crystalline solid that is insoluble in water and petroleum ether, but well soluble in ethanol, diethyl ether, and benzene. In strongly acidic solutions, it produces an intensely yellow color, due to the formation of a stable "trityl" carbocation. Many derivatives of triphenylmethanol are important dyes.

History 
After the German chemist August Kekulé and his Belgian student Antoine Paul Nicolas Franchimont (1844–1919) first synthesized triphenylmethane in 1872, the Russian doctoral student Walerius Hemilian (1851–1914) first synthesized triphenylmethanol in 1874 by reacting triphenylmethyl bromide with water as well as by oxidizing triphenylmethane.

Structure and properties
Triphenylmethanol features three phenyl (Ph) rings and an alcohol group bound to a central tetrahedral carbon atom. All three C–Ph bonds are typical of sp3-sp2 carbon-carbon bonds with lengths of approximately 1.47 Å, while the C–O bond length is approximately 1.42 Å.

The presence of three adjacent phenyl groups confers special properties manifested in the reactivity of the alcohol.  For example it reacts with acetyl chloride, not to give the ester, but triphenylmethyl chloride:
Ph3COH + MeCOCl → Ph3CCl + MeCO2H

The three phenyl groups also offer steric protection. Reaction with hydrogen peroxide gives an unusually stable hydroperoxide, Ph3COOH.

Acid-base properties
As a derivative of methanol, triphenylmethanol is expected to have a pKa in the range of 16-19. Typical of alcohols, resonance offers no stabilization of the conjugate base due to being bonded to a saturated carbon atom. Stabilization of the anion by solvation forces is largely ineffective due to the steric influence of the three phenyl groups.

The basicity of triphenylmethanol is enhanced due to the formation of a resonance-stabilized carbocation upon breaking of the C–O bond. After protonation of the oxygen under strongly acidic conditions, triphenylmethanol loses water to form the triphenylmethyl ("trityl") cation:
Ph3COH + H+ → Ph3C+ + H2O  
The trityl cation is one of the easiest carbocations to isolate, although it quickly reacts with water.

Synthesis
The preparation of triphenylmethanol from methyl benzoate or benzophenone and phenylmagnesium bromide is a common laboratory experiment for illustrating the Grignard reaction. An alternative starting material is diethyl carbonate.

Applications
Although not of major industrial importance, triphenylmethanol is a useful reagent in the research laboratory.  Substituted derivatives of triphenylmethanol are intermediates in the production of the commercially useful triarylmethane dyes.

References

Tertiary alcohols
Phenyl compounds